Up All Night is the fourth studio album by Australian folk band The Waifs, first released by Jarrah in January 2003. Critics reacted more favourably to this release and it has been the band's biggest album to date.

Up All Night debuted on the Australian ARIA album chart at No. 3 and 12 months later had shipped over 140,000 copies, garnering a double platinum accreditation.

Their hard work was rewarded at the ARIA Music Awards of 2003 they won Best Independent Release, Best Blues and Roots Album for Up All Night, as well as Engineer of the Year and Producer of the Year for Chris Thompson's work on the album. The media celebrated with them, calling them an "overnight success 11 years in the making!".

In some parts of North America, the album was packaged with a bonus sampler of Waifs songs.

Track listing
"Fisherman's Daughter" (D. Simpson) – 4:43
"Nothing New" (V. Simpson) – 3:32
"London Still" (D. Simpson) – 3:46
"Lighthouse" (Cunningham) – 3:21
"Flesh And Blood" (Cunningham) – 4:00
"Highway One" (D. Simpson) – 5:07
"Since I've Been Around" (Cunningham) – 4:40
"Fourth Floor" (Cunningham) – 3:25
"Rescue" (D. Simpson) – 2:32
"Three Down" (V. Simpson) – 3:18
"Sweetness" (D. Simpson) – 3:24
"Up All Night" (Cunningham) – 5:51

Personnel

Musical
Josh Cunningham - Dobro, Guitar, Mandolin, Songwriter, Ukulele, Vocals, Group Member 
Donna Simpson - Guitar (Acoustic), Songwriter, Vocals, Group Member  
Vikki Simpson - Guitar (Acoustic), Harmonica, Songwriter, Vocals, Group Member
Ben Franz - Bass, Dobro, Bass (Electric), Double Bass
David MacDonald - Percussion, Drums 
Bruce Haymes - Keyboards, Wurlitzer

Technical
Sam Hickey - Design, Photography, Typography  
Mark Howard - Engineer  
Tony "Jack The Bear" Mantz - Mastering 
Victor Rijken - Photography  Official Site
Steven Schram - Producer, Assistant Engineer, Mixing, Mixing Assistant  
Chris Thompson - Producer, Engineer, Mixing  
The Waifs - Photography

Charts

Weekly charts

Year-end charts

Certifications

References

External links
Official site

2003 albums
ARIA Award-winning albums
The Waifs albums